Niphona micropuncticollis is a species of beetle in the family Cerambycidae. It was described by Stephan von Breuning and Chujô in 1961. It is known from Thailand.

References

micropuncticollis
Beetles described in 1961